James Daly may refer to:

James Daly (actor) (1918–1978), American theater, film and television actor
James Daly (died 1769) (1716–1769), Irish MP for Athenry 1747–1768 and Galway Borough 1768–1769
James Daly (activist) (1838–1911), organiser of the first Irish Land League meeting in 1879 and owner-editor of the Connaught Telegraph 1876–1888
James Daly (journalist), San Francisco Bay Area journalist
James Daly (mutineer) (1899–1920), leader of the mutiny of the Connaught Rangers in 1920
James Daly (New York City) (1844–1892), New York politician
James Daly (Irish nationalist politician) (1852–1910), Irish MP for the constituency of South Monaghan 1895–1902
James Daly (English politician), English Conservative Party politician
James Daly, 1st Baron Dunsandle and Clanconal (1782–1847), Member of Parliament (MP) for County Galway, Ireland
James Joseph Daly (1921–2013), American prelate of the Roman Catholic Church
James Daly (jockey), rode in the 1846 Grand National
James Daly (footballer) (born 2000), English footballer playing for Bristol Rovers
James Louis Daly, New Caledonian businessman and politician
James Daly (co-operator) (1811–1849), founding member of the Rochdale Society of Equitable Pioneers

See also
James Daley (disambiguation)
Jim Daly (disambiguation)
Jimmy Daly (1904–?), Irish footballer
Jimmy Dailey (1927–2002), Scottish footballer